Souto is a former civil parish in the municipality of Santa Maria da Feira, Portugal. In 2013, the parish merged into the new parish São Miguel do Souto e Mosteirô. It has a population of 4,835 inhabitants and a total area of 9.40 km2.

References

Former parishes of Santa Maria da Feira